David Rushton (born 3 May 1973) is an English former footballer who played as a midfielder for Port Vale.

Career
Rushton graduated through the Port Vale juniors to sign his first professional contract in July 1991. He made his debut in a 4–0 defeat to Leicester City in a second round Full Members Cup match at Filbert Street on 23 October. He was given a free transfer in May 1992.

Career statistics
Source:

References

1973 births
Living people
Footballers from Stoke-on-Trent
English footballers
Association football midfielders
Port Vale F.C. players
English Football League players